Champsodon is the sole genus in the family Champsodontidae.  These fishes, the crocodile toothfishes, are native to the Indo-Pacific region.

Species
The currently recognized species in this genus are:
 Champsodon atridorsalis Ochiai & I. Nakamura, 1964
 Champsodon capensis Regan, 1908 (gaper)
 Champsodon fimbriatus C. H. Gilbert, 1905
 Champsodon guentheri Regan, 1908 (Günther's sabre-gills)
 Champsodon longipinnis Matsubara & Amaoka, 1964
 Champsodon machaeratus Nemeth, 1994
 Champsodon nudivittis (J. D. Ogilby, 1895)
 Champsodon omanensis Regan, 1908
 Champsodon pantolepis Nemeth, 1994
 Champsodon sagittus Nemeth, 1994
 Champsodon sechellensis Regan, 1908
 Champsodon snyderi V. Franz, 1910
 Champsodon vorax Günther, 1867

References

External links

 Champsodontidae on World Register of Marine Species

Trachiniformes
Taxa named by Albert Günther